EROFS (Enhanced Read-Only File System) is a lightweight read-only file system initially developed by Huawei for the Linux kernel.

EROFS aims to form a generic read-only filesystem solution for various read-only use cases (embedded devices, containers and more) instead of just focusing on storage space saving without considering any side effects of runtime performance.

For example, it provides a solution to save storage space by using transparent compression for scenarios which need high-performance read-only
requirements on their devices with limited hardware resources, e.g. smartphones like Android and HarmonyOS.
All of Huawei's new products shipped with EMUI 9.0.1 or later used EROFS, and it was promoted as one of the key features of EMUI 9.1. OPPO and Xiaomi products also use EROFS.

Also, it provides a content-addressable chunk-based container image solution together with lazy pulling feature to accelerate container startup speed by using new file-based fscache backend since Linux kernel v5.19.

The file system was formally merged into the mainline kernel with Linux kernel v5.4.

Features 
The file system has two different inode on-disk layouts. One is compact, and the other is extended.
 Little-endian on-disk design
 4 KB block size and 32-bit block address, which limits the total possible capacity of an EROFS filesystem to 16 TB.
 Metadata and data could be mixed by tail-packing inline data technology
 Support POSIX attributes and permissions, xattr and ACL
 Fixed-output transparent compression with LZ4 for relative higher compression ratios
 In-place decompression for higher sequential read 
 Big pcluster feature allowing up to 1 MiB big pclusters for better compression ratios since Linux 5.13.
 Direct I/O, Direct Access (DAX) support, chunk-based data de-duplication for uncompressed files since Linux 5.15.
 Multiple device support for multiple layer container images since Linux 5.16.
 MicroLZMA algorithm support since Linux 5.16.
 Ztailpacking support since Linux 5.17.
 File-based Fscache backend support since Linux 5.19 with "on-demand mode".

See also 
 cramfs
 ext4 - previously Huawei used this file system for its system partitions
 SquashFS

References

External links 
 
 
  - git.kernel.org
  - git.kernel.org
  - blog.sigma-star.at

Embedded Linux
Compression file systems
Free special-purpose file systems
File systems supported by the Linux kernel
Read-only file systems supported by the Linux kernel